Senator McClelland may refer to:

Charles P. McClelland (1854–1944), New York State Senate
David McClelland (politician), Northern Irish Senate
James D. McClelland (1848–1919), New York State Senate

See also
Senator McClellan (disambiguation)